East Meets West may refer to:

Film and television
 East Meets West (1936 film), a British film
 East Meets West (1995 film), a Japanese film
 East Meets West (2011 film), a Hong Kong film
 East Meets West (TV series), a cooking show on the Food Network
 "East Meets West", the first five episodes of Ninja Turtles: The Next Mutation

Music
 East Meets West Music, the record label of the Ravi Shankar Foundation
 East Meets West (Ahmed Abdul-Malik album), 1960
 East Meets West (John Scofield album), 1977
 "East Meets West", a song by Frankie Valli and the Four Seasons and the Beach Boys, 1984
 "East Meets West", a song by Sam and the Womp, 2016

Other uses
 East Meets West (non-governmental organization), a U.S.-based medical and health charity operating in Asia and Africa
 East Meets West, a podcast by Roger Chang and Tom Merritt